Netechma zemiotes is a species of moth of the family Tortricidae. It is found in Peru.

The wingspan is 19 mm. The ground colour of the forewings is cream with weak brownish pink suffusions at the base and in the median part of the wing. The hindwings are cream tinged with yellowish towards the apex.

Etymology
The species name refers to the shape of sacculus and is derived from Greek zemiotes (meaning detriment).

References

Moths described in 2010
Netechma